Gentlemen (foaled 1992) is an Argentinian Thoroughbred racehorse. He was the Champion Three-Year-Old Colt in Argentina and  then raced successfully in the United States.

Background
Gentlemen is a chestnut horse bred at the Haras de la Pomme in Argentina. He was sired by Robin des Bois, an American-bred, French-trained son of Nureyev.

Racing career
Racing at age three in 1995, Gentlemen won the Gran Premio Nacional, (Argentine Derby) and Gran Premio Polla de Potrillos (Argentine 2000 Guineas).

Gentlemen was brought to race in the United States in 1996, under California trainer Richard Mandella. Although he was ineligible for the Breeders' Cup, Gentlemen met with considerable success. In 1997 he was arguably the best racehorse in North America. On May 10 he captured the Pimlico Special at Pimlico Race Course in Baltimore, Maryland conceding three pounds to Skip Away.  In June he won the  Hollywood Gold Cup by four lengths from the Brazilian champion Siphon with the future Arlington Million winner Marlin a further five and a quarter lengths back in fourth. In August he won the Pacific Classic Stakes at Del Mar, beating Siphon by two and three quarter lengths. He was less successful as a six-year-old in 1998, producing his best performance when second to Wagon Limit in the Jockey Club Gold Cup.

In 1998 he was entered into the Classic at the Breeders' Cup, with Richard Mandella as trainer, though Gentlemen ended up not competing because of an injury.

Racing statistics

Stud record
In 1999, Gentlemen began stud duty at Walmac Farm in Lexington, Kentucky, where he met with modest success. In late 2007, he was purchased by Elite Stables, LLC and moved to Elite Thoroughbreds in Folsom, Louisiana. His 2008 stud fee was listed at a special introductory fee of $1500.

Pedigree 

Gentlemen is inbred 4S × 4D to Graustark, meaning Graustark appears in the fourth generation on both the sire and dam's side of the pedigree. Gentlemen is also inbred to Northern Dancer 3S × 4D.

References

Racehorses bred in Argentina
Racehorses trained in Argentina
Racehorses trained in the United States
American Grade 1 Stakes winners
Thoroughbred family 7-a